Sunset Park High School is a public high school located at 153 35th Street, in Sunset Park, Brooklyn, New York, United States, under the jurisdiction of the New York City Department of Education. The school was built in 2009. and the current principal is Victoria Antonini.

Overview
Sunset Park High School is a college-preparatory high school. All students are programmed for an advanced regents diploma.
 
The school was built in 2009 and the building is fully accessibile to people with physical disabilities.

Programs

Advanced Placement
The school offers Advanced Placement courses in U.S. government and politics, psychology, computer science principles, biology, human geography,  Spanish language and culture and  English language and composition.

Sports
The school offers a variety of varsity and junior varsity sports. These sports include badminton, baseball, basketball, handball soccer, softball, volleyball and wrestling.

Extracurricular activities
The school offers many extracurricular activities, including Art, Chorus, Dance, Debate, Homework Help/Tutoring, Internship Program, Knitting, Literary Magazine, Makers-Club, Music Production, National Honor Society, Photography, SAT Prep, Student Council, Theater, Urban Barcode Club (Science Focused-DNA), and Yearbook. In addition to a school-wide Student Council, students can also participate in a small learning community-based student leadership team.

Dual-language program
In 2018, the school added a Spanish Dual Language program.

References 

Public high schools in Brooklyn
Sunset Park, Brooklyn